Zygogramma arizonica is a species of beetle belonging to the family Zygogramma.

Description
Z. arizonica is a small leaf beetle with a brown pronotum and yellow elytra marked with elongated brown stripes and spots.

Distribution and Habitat
Z. arizonica is native to North America.

Adult beetles are associated generally with plants of the family Asteraceae), with a tentative relationship with the American trixis (Trixis californica).

References

External links
Multiple images of Zygogramma arizonica

Chrysomelinae
Beetles described in 1906
Beetles of North America